The following species in the flowering plant genus Oxytropis, one of the genera called the locoweeds, are accepted by Plants of the World Online. Although monophyletic, this genus has undergone such rapid, "explosive" evolutionary radiation that conventional molecular methods will not be able to elucidate its infrageneric relationships.

Oxytropis acanthacea 
Oxytropis aciphylla 
Oxytropis adamsiana 
Oxytropis adenophylla 
Oxytropis admiranda 
Oxytropis adscendens 
Oxytropis aellenii 
Oxytropis afghanica 
Oxytropis ajanensis 
Oxytropis albana 
Oxytropis alberti-regelii 
Oxytropis albiflora 
Oxytropis albovillosa 
Oxytropis alii 
Oxytropis almaatensis 
Oxytropis alpestris 
Oxytropis alpicola 
Oxytropis alpina 
Oxytropis altaica 
Oxytropis ambigua 
Oxytropis amethystea 
Oxytropis ammophila 
Oxytropis ampullata 
Oxytropis anaulgensis 
Oxytropis andersii 
Oxytropis anertii 
Oxytropis anyemaqensis 
Oxytropis approximata 
Oxytropis arassanica 
Oxytropis arbaevae 
Oxytropis arctica 
Oxytropis arenae-ripariae 
Oxytropis argentata 
Oxytropis argyroleuca 
Oxytropis armeniaca 
Oxytropis arystangalievii 
Oxytropis aspera 
Oxytropis assiensis 
Oxytropis asterocarpa 
Oxytropis astragaloides 
Oxytropis atbaschi 
Oxytropis aucheri 
Oxytropis aulieatensis 
Oxytropis aurea 
Oxytropis auriculata 
Oxytropis austrosachalinensis 
Oxytropis avis 
Oxytropis azerbaijanica 
Oxytropis babatagi 
Oxytropis baburi 
Oxytropis baicalia 
Oxytropis baissunensis 
Oxytropis bajtulinii 
Oxytropis bakhtiarica 
Oxytropis baldshuanica 
Oxytropis bargusinensis 
Oxytropis barkolensis 
Oxytropis barkultagi 
Oxytropis barunensis 
Oxytropis baschkiriensis 
Oxytropis baxoiensis 
Oxytropis bella 
Oxytropis bellii 
Oxytropis beringensis 
Oxytropis besseyi 
Oxytropis bicolor 
Oxytropis bicornis 
Oxytropis biflora 
Oxytropis biloba 
Oxytropis binaludensis 
Oxytropis birirensis 
Oxytropis bobrovii 
Oxytropis bogdoschanica 
Oxytropis boguschi 
Oxytropis borealis 
Oxytropis bosculensis 
Oxytropis brachycarpa 
Oxytropis bracteata 
Oxytropis bracteolata 
Oxytropis brevicaulis 
Oxytropis brevipedunculata 
Oxytropis bryophila 
Oxytropis bungei 
Oxytropis burchan-buddae 
Oxytropis burhanbudaica 
Oxytropis cabulica 
Oxytropis cachemiriana 
Oxytropis caespitosa 
Oxytropis caespitosula 
Oxytropis calcareorum 
Oxytropis callophylla 
Oxytropis calva 
Oxytropis campanulata 
Oxytropis campestris 
Oxytropis cana 
Oxytropis candicans 
Oxytropis candolleorum 
Oxytropis canopatula 
Oxytropis capusii 
Oxytropis carpatica 
Oxytropis caudiciramosa 
Oxytropis chakassiensis 
Oxytropis chantengriensis 
Oxytropis charkeviczii 
Oxytropis chesneyoides 
Oxytropis chiliophylla 
Oxytropis chinglingensis 
Oxytropis chionobia 
Oxytropis chionophylla 
Oxytropis chitralensis 
Oxytropis chorgossica 
Oxytropis chrysocarpa 
Oxytropis ciliata 
Oxytropis cinerascens 
Oxytropis cinerea 
Oxytropis coelestis 
Oxytropis coerulea 
Oxytropis columbina 
Oxytropis compacta 
Oxytropis confusa 
Oxytropis crassiuscula 
Oxytropis cretacea 
Oxytropis cuspidata 
Oxytropis czapan-daghi 
Oxytropis czekanowskii 
Oxytropis czerskii 
Oxytropis czukotica 
Oxytropis danorum 
Oxytropis darpirensis 
Oxytropis dashtikavarensis 
Oxytropis dasypoda 
Oxytropis datongensis 
Oxytropis deflexa 
Oxytropis dehra-duni 
Oxytropis densa 
Oxytropis densiflora 
Oxytropis diantha 
Oxytropis dichroantha 
Oxytropis didymophysa 
Oxytropis dinarica 
Oxytropis diversifolia 
Oxytropis dorogostajskyi 
Oxytropis dschagastaica 
Oxytropis dubia 
Oxytropis dumbedanica 
Oxytropis duthieana 
Oxytropis echidna 
Oxytropis eriocarpa 
Oxytropis ervicarpa 
Oxytropis evenorum 
Oxytropis exserta 
Oxytropis falcata 
Oxytropis farsi 
Oxytropis fasciculiflorum 
Oxytropis fedtschenkoana 
Oxytropis fedtschenkoi 
Oxytropis ferganensis 
Oxytropis fetida 
Oxytropis fetisowii 
Oxytropis floribunda 
Oxytropis fohlenensis 
Oxytropis foucaudii 
Oxytropis fragilifolia 
Oxytropis fragiliphylla 
Oxytropis frigida 
Oxytropis fruticulosa 
Oxytropis fuscescens 
Oxytropis gandeensis 
Oxytropis ganningensis 
Oxytropis gebleri 
Oxytropis gebleriana 
Oxytropis gerzeensis 
Oxytropis gilgitensis 
Oxytropis giraldii 
Oxytropis glabra 
Oxytropis glandulosa 
Oxytropis glareosa 
Oxytropis globiflora 
Oxytropis gloriosa 
Oxytropis gmelinii 
Oxytropis golengolensis 
Oxytropis gorbunovii 
Oxytropis gorodkovii 
Oxytropis graminetorum 
Oxytropis grandiflora 
Oxytropis griffithii 
Oxytropis gubanovii 
Oxytropis gueldenstaedtioides 
Oxytropis guilanica 
Oxytropis guinanensis 
Oxytropis guntensis 
Oxytropis gymnogyne 
Oxytropis hailarensis 
Oxytropis halleri 
Oxytropis hedgei 
Oxytropis helenae 
Oxytropis helvetica 
Oxytropis heratensis 
Oxytropis heterophylla 
Oxytropis heteropoda 
Oxytropis heterotricha 
Oxytropis hindukuschensis 
Oxytropis hippolyti 
Oxytropis hirsuta 
Oxytropis hirsutiuscula 
Oxytropis hirta 
Oxytropis holanshanensis 
Oxytropis huashixiaensis 
Oxytropis huddelsonii 
Oxytropis hudsonica 
Oxytropis humifusa 
Oxytropis × hybrida 
Oxytropis hypoglottoides 
Oxytropis hypsophila 
Oxytropis hystrix 
Oxytropis imbricata 
Oxytropis immersa 
Oxytropis inaria 
Oxytropis incana 
Oxytropis incanescens 
Oxytropis includens 
Oxytropis indensis 
Oxytropis indurata 
Oxytropis inopinata 
Oxytropis inschanica 
Oxytropis integripetala 
Oxytropis intermedia 
Oxytropis interposita 
Oxytropis iranica 
Oxytropis irbis 
Oxytropis ishkashimorum 
Oxytropis iskanderica 
Oxytropis itoana 
Oxytropis jabalambrensis 
Oxytropis japonica 
Oxytropis javaherdehi 
Oxytropis jordalii 
Oxytropis jucunda 
Oxytropis junatovii 
Oxytropis jurtzevii 
Oxytropis kalamii 
Oxytropis kamelinii 
Oxytropis kamtschatica 
Oxytropis kansuensis 
Oxytropis karataviensis 
Oxytropis karavaevii 
Oxytropis karjaginii 
Oxytropis kasakorum 
Oxytropis kaspensis 
Oxytropis katangensis 
Oxytropis kateninii 
Oxytropis kazidanica 
Oxytropis ketmenica 
Oxytropis khinjahi 
Oxytropis klementzii 
Oxytropis knjazevii 
Oxytropis kobukensis 
Oxytropis kodarensis 
Oxytropis kokrinensis 
Oxytropis komei 
Oxytropis kopetdagensis 
Oxytropis korabensis 
Oxytropis kordkoyensis 
Oxytropis kossinskyi 
Oxytropis kotschyana 
Oxytropis kozhuharovii 
Oxytropis krylovii 
Oxytropis kubanensis 
Oxytropis kuchanensis 
Oxytropis kuhistanica 
Oxytropis kukkonenii 
Oxytropis kumaonensis 
Oxytropis kumbelica 
Oxytropis kunarensis 
Oxytropis kunashiriensis 
Oxytropis kungurensis 
Oxytropis kuramensis 
Oxytropis kusnetzovii 
Oxytropis kyziltalensis 
Oxytropis ladyginii 
Oxytropis lagopus 
Oxytropis lambertii 
Oxytropis lanata 
Oxytropis lanceatifoliola 
Oxytropis langshanica 
Oxytropis lanuginosa 
Oxytropis lapponica 
Oxytropis larionovii 
Oxytropis lasiocarpa 
Oxytropis lasiopoda 
Oxytropis latialata 
Oxytropis latibracteata 
Oxytropis lavrenkoi 
Oxytropis laxiracemosa 
Oxytropis lazica 
Oxytropis lehmannii 
Oxytropis leptophylla 
Oxytropis leptophysa 
Oxytropis × lessingiana 
Oxytropis leucantha 
Oxytropis leucocyanea 
Oxytropis leucotricha 
Oxytropis lhasaensis 
Oxytropis liliputa 
Oxytropis linczevskii 
Oxytropis linearibracteata 
Oxytropis lipskyi 
Oxytropis lithophila 
Oxytropis litoralis 
Oxytropis litwinowii 
Oxytropis longialata 
Oxytropis longibracteata 
Oxytropis longirostra 
Oxytropis lupinoides 
Oxytropis lutchensis 
Oxytropis luteocaerulea 
Oxytropis lydiae 
Oxytropis macrobotrys 
Oxytropis macrocarpa 
Oxytropis macrodonta 
Oxytropis macrosema 
Oxytropis × madiotii 
Oxytropis maduoensis 
Oxytropis mahneshanensis 
Oxytropis maidantalensis 
Oxytropis malacophylla 
Oxytropis malloryana 
Oxytropis maqinensis 
Oxytropis marco-poloi 
Oxytropis margacea 
Oxytropis martjanovii 
Oxytropis masarensis 
Oxytropis maydelliana 
Oxytropis megalantha 
Oxytropis megalorrhyncha 
Oxytropis meinshausenii 
Oxytropis melaleuca 
Oxytropis melanocalyx 
Oxytropis melanotricha 
Oxytropis merkensis 
Oxytropis mertensiana 
Oxytropis michelsonii 
Oxytropis micrantha 
Oxytropis microcarpa 
Oxytropis microphylla 
Oxytropis microsphaera 
Oxytropis middendorffii 
Oxytropis minjanensis 
Oxytropis mixotriche 
Oxytropis moellendorffii 
Oxytropis mollis 
Oxytropis mongolica 
Oxytropis monophylla 
Oxytropis montana 
Oxytropis monticola 
Oxytropis morenarum 
Oxytropis multiceps 
Oxytropis mumynabadensis 
Oxytropis muricata 
Oxytropis myriophylla 
Oxytropis nana 
Oxytropis nanda-devi 
Oxytropis neglecta 
Oxytropis neimonggolica 
Oxytropis neorechingeriana 
Oxytropis nepalensis 
Oxytropis niedzweckiana 
Oxytropis nigrescens 
Oxytropis nikolai 
Oxytropis nitens 
Oxytropis nivea 
Oxytropis nuda 
Oxytropis nuristanica 
Oxytropis nutans 
Oxytropis ochotensis 
Oxytropis ochrantha 
Oxytropis ochrocephala 
Oxytropis ochroleuca 
Oxytropis ochrolongibracteata 
Oxytropis ocrensis 
Oxytropis oligantha 
Oxytropis oreophila 
Oxytropis ornata 
Oxytropis oroboides 
Oxytropis ovczinnikovii 
Oxytropis owerinii 
Oxytropis oxyphylla 
Oxytropis oxyphylloides 
Oxytropis pakistanica 
Oxytropis pallasii 
Oxytropis pamiroalajca 
Oxytropis panjshirica 
Oxytropis parasericeopetala 
Oxytropis parryi 
Oxytropis parvanensis 
Oxytropis pauciflora 
Oxytropis pavlovii 
Oxytropis pellita 
Oxytropis penduliflora 
Oxytropis persica 
Oxytropis peschkovae 
Oxytropis physocarpa 
Oxytropis piceetorum 
Oxytropis pilosa 
Oxytropis pilosissima 
Oxytropis platonychia 
Oxytropis platysema 
Oxytropis podlechii 
Oxytropis podocarpa 
Oxytropis podoloba 
Oxytropis polyphylla 
Oxytropis poncinsii 
Oxytropis ponomarjevii 
Oxytropis popoviana 
Oxytropis potaninii 
Oxytropis prenja 
Oxytropis proboscidea 
Oxytropis prostrata 
Oxytropis protopopovii 
Oxytropis proxima 
Oxytropis przewalskii 
Oxytropis pseudocoerulea 
Oxytropis pseudofrigida 
Oxytropis pseudoglandulosa 
Oxytropis pseudohirsuta 
Oxytropis pseudohirsutiuscula 
Oxytropis pseudoleptophysa 
Oxytropis pseudomyriophylla 
Oxytropis pseudorosea 
Oxytropis pseudosuavis 
Oxytropis puberula 
Oxytropis pulvinoides 
Oxytropis pumila 
Oxytropis pumilio 
Oxytropis purpurea 
Oxytropis pusilla 
Oxytropis putoranica 
Oxytropis qaidamensis 
Oxytropis qamdoensis 
Oxytropis qilianshanica 
Oxytropis qinghaiensis 
Oxytropis qingnanensis 
Oxytropis qitaiensis 
Oxytropis racemosa 
Oxytropis ramosissima 
Oxytropis rarytkinensis 
Oxytropis rautii 
Oxytropis rechingeri 
Oxytropis recognita 
Oxytropis regelii 
Oxytropis reniformis 
Oxytropis retusa 
Oxytropis reverdattoi 
Oxytropis revoluta 
Oxytropis × rhaetica 
Oxytropis rhizantha 
Oxytropis rhodontha 
Oxytropis rhynchophysa 
Oxytropis ribumoo 
Oxytropis rosea 
Oxytropis roseiformis 
Oxytropis rostrata 
Oxytropis rubriargillosa 
Oxytropis rubricaudex 
Oxytropis rudbariensis 
Oxytropis ruebsaamenii 
Oxytropis rupifraga 
Oxytropis ruthenica 
Oxytropis sabzavarensis 
Oxytropis sacciformis 
Oxytropis sachalinensis 
Oxytropis sajanensis 
Oxytropis salangensis 
Oxytropis salicetorum 
Oxytropis salukensis 
Oxytropis sanjappae 
Oxytropis saperlebulensis 
Oxytropis saposhnikovii 
Oxytropis sarkandensis 
Oxytropis sata-kandaonensis 
Oxytropis satpaevii 
Oxytropis saurica 
Oxytropis savellanica 
Oxytropis scabrida 
Oxytropis scammaniana 
Oxytropis schachimardanica 
Oxytropis scheludjakovae 
Oxytropis schmorgunoviae 
Oxytropis schrenkii 
Oxytropis selengensis 
Oxytropis semenowii 
Oxytropis seravschanica 
Oxytropis sericea 
Oxytropis sericopetala 
Oxytropis setifera 
Oxytropis setosa 
Oxytropis sewerzowii 
Oxytropis shahvarica 
Oxytropis shanxiensis 
Oxytropis shennongjiaensis 
Oxytropis shivae 
Oxytropis siah-sangi 
Oxytropis sibajensis 
Oxytropis sichuanica 
Oxytropis siegizmundii 
Oxytropis sinkiangensis 
Oxytropis siomensis 
Oxytropis sitaipaiensis 
Oxytropis sivehensis 
Oxytropis siziwangensis 
Oxytropis sobolevskajae 
Oxytropis sojakii 
Oxytropis songorica 
Oxytropis sordida 
Oxytropis spicata 
Oxytropis spinifer 
Oxytropis splendens 
Oxytropis squammulosa 
Oxytropis staintoniana 
Oxytropis staintonii 
Oxytropis stenofoliola 
Oxytropis stenophylla 
Oxytropis stracheyana 
Oxytropis strobilacea 
Oxytropis stukovii 
Oxytropis suavis 
Oxytropis subcapitata 
Oxytropis submutica 
Oxytropis subnutans 
Oxytropis subpodoloba 
Oxytropis subverticillaris 
Oxytropis sulphurea 
Oxytropis sumneviczii 
Oxytropis suprajenissejensis 
Oxytropis surculosa 
Oxytropis susamyrensis 
Oxytropis susumanica 
Oxytropis sutaica 
Oxytropis sutakensis 
Oxytropis sverdrupii 
Oxytropis sylvatica 
Oxytropis szovitsii 
Oxytropis tachtensis 
Oxytropis talassica 
Oxytropis taldycola 
Oxytropis talgarica 
Oxytropis taochensis 
Oxytropis tashkurensis 
Oxytropis tatarica 
Oxytropis tenuirostris 
Oxytropis tenuis 
Oxytropis tenuissima 
Oxytropis terekensis 
Oxytropis teres 
Oxytropis tianschanica 
Oxytropis tichomirovii 
Oxytropis tilingii 
Oxytropis todomoshiriensis 
Oxytropis tomentosa 
Oxytropis tomoriensis 
Oxytropis tompudae 
Oxytropis torrentium 
Oxytropis tragacanthoides 
Oxytropis trajectorum 
Oxytropis transalaica 
Oxytropis trichocalycina 
Oxytropis trichophora 
Oxytropis trichophysa 
Oxytropis trichosphaera 
Oxytropis triflora 
Oxytropis triphylla 
Oxytropis tschatkalensis 
Oxytropis tschimganica 
Oxytropis tschujae 
Oxytropis tudanensis 
Oxytropis tukemansuensis 
Oxytropis tunnellii 
Oxytropis turczaninovii 
Oxytropis tyttantha 
Oxytropis ugamensis 
Oxytropis ugamica 
Oxytropis ulzijchutagii 
Oxytropis uniflora 
Oxytropis uralensis 
Oxytropis urumovii 
Oxytropis uschakovii 
Oxytropis vadimii 
Oxytropis vakhdzhirii 
Oxytropis valerii 
Oxytropis varlakovii 
Oxytropis vassilczenkoi 
Oxytropis vassilievii 
Oxytropis vasskovskyi 
Oxytropis vavilovii 
Oxytropis vermicularis 
Oxytropis viae-amicitiae 
Oxytropis viridiflava 
Oxytropis volkii 
Oxytropis vositensis 
Oxytropis vvedenskyi 
Oxytropis williamsii 
Oxytropis wologdensis 
Oxytropis wrangelii 
Oxytropis wutaiensis 
Oxytropis xidatanensis 
Oxytropis xinghaiensis 
Oxytropis xinglongshanica 
Oxytropis yanchiensis 
Oxytropis yekenensis 
Oxytropis yunnanensis 
Oxytropis zadoiensis 
Oxytropis zaprjagaevae 
Oxytropis zaquensis 
Oxytropis zekogensis 
Oxytropis zemuensis

References

Oxytropis